Paper Tapes is the debut album by the band The Lonely Hearts. A previous album, Photographs & Tidalwaves was recorded under the name "Holland," which was changed for legal reasons; the composition of the group also changed at the same time.

Track listing

 "Passive Aggressive"
 "Mermaid"
 "Love Comes Quickly"
 "Heartbreaker"
 "Weary Eyes"
 "Love and Politics"
 "Death of Me"
 "War Brides"
 "Good Intentions"
 "Movie Night"

2006 debut albums
The Lonely Hearts albums
Tooth & Nail Records albums